The Inspector's Gate (or the Council Gate) is one of the gates of the al-Aqsa Compound. 
It is the second-northernmost gates in the compound's west wall, after the Bani Ghanim Gate. 
It is north of the Iron Gate.

Names 
It has two current Arabic names, both are in use:
 the Inspector's Gate or Superintendant's Gate: named after the Inspector of the Two Noble Sanctuaries, the  [of Jerusalem and Hebron] – not to be confused with the Servant of the Two Noble Sanctuaries [of Mecca and Medina].  It was also translated, less precisely, as "Gate of the Watchman". 
 the Council Gate: named after the Supreme Muslim Council.

Its obsolete names:
 Michael's Gate (  or  ): named after Michael the archangel.
 the Gate of ʿAlāʾ ad-Dīn al-Baṣīr: named after a nearby ribat: the Aladdin Ribat, which in turn was named after Emir ʿAlāʾ ad-Dīn al-Baṣīr.
 the Prison Gate, when the ribat was converted into a prison.

History
It was probably built on the same spot as the Umayyad-period Gate of al-Walīd.
It was rebuilt in 1203, during the Ayyubid era. 
The gate was expanded in the Mamluk period, especially from the eastern side, during the time of Sultan al-Nasir Muhammad bin Qalawun.

Description
The gate consists of a high and wide entrance, held with a pointed stone knot, with two wooden supports supported by it, topped on the western side by a written copper strip.
On the eastern side of the entrance, there is a square shape inside the hallway of the mosque, with open sides covered with a shallow dome, with three rows of muqarnas.

Environs 

The southwestern part of the Muslim Quarter is west (outside) of the gate. The immediate neighborhood is home to a community of Afro-Palestinians. 
Aladdin Street (Bāb an-Nāẓir Street) leads towards the gate. 

In the compound's western wall, the gate is between al-Manjakiyya Madrasa (to its north) and the al-Wafā’iyya Zawiya (to its south). 
In front of each school, there is a sebil. 
In front of al-Wafā’iyya is the Mustafa Agha Sebil (al-Budayrī Sabil).

References

Gates in Jerusalem's Old City Walls